Zinovyevo is a rural locality (a selo) in Andreyevskoye Rural Settlement, Alexandrovsky District, Vladimir Oblast, Russia. The population was 6 as of 2010.

Geography 
Zinovyevo is located 21 km west of Alexandrov (the district's administrative centre) by road. Kudrino is the nearest rural locality.

References 

Rural localities in Alexandrovsky District, Vladimir Oblast